The Mercury Colony Park is an American luxury full-size station wagon that was marketed by the Mercury division of Ford Motor Company between 1957 and 1991. Distinguished by its simulated wood-grain paneling, the Colony Park was marketed as either the premium-trim or the sole full-size station wagon offering of the division. Following the 1960 demise of Edsel, full-size Mercury vehicles shared bodywork with Ford; the Colony Park served as the counterpart of the Ford Country Squire through 1991.

Serving as the flagship, and more exclusive, station wagon series of the Ford Motor Company — as the Lincoln division has not offered a factory-produced station wagon — the Colony Park was marketed against the similar Chrysler Town & Country prior to its 1979 downsizing, and GM's Buick Estate and Oldsmobile Custom Cruiser, each also offering external (simulated) woodgrain trim. During the mid-1950s and '60s, the Mercury Commuter was briefly offered as a lower-priced alternative to the Colony Park without the simulated woodgrain appearance, but lost sales to the very similar Ford Country Sedan and Ford Ranch Wagon and was cancelled in 1968, leaving the Colony Park as the only Mercury station wagon. In 1976, American Motors Corporation introduced the Jeep Grand Wagoneer, with similar passenger accommodation, luxury standard equipment and a simulated woodgrain appearance built on a dedicated chassis.

Through the late 1980s, demand for full-size station wagons declined as consumer interests shifted towards minivans and four-door SUVs. As the Ford Crown Victoria and Mercury Grand Marquis underwent a major redesign for the 1992 model year, the two model lines dropped the station wagon body from the lineup. Up to the 2010 closure of the Mercury brand, the Colony Park was not directly replaced.

First generation (1957–1958)

For 1957, the Mercury model line underwent major revisions. Instead of sharing bodies with trim distinguishing each division, Edsel and Mercury would share the chassis and powertrain (an all-new line of V8 engines), with each model line having different wheelbases and completely distinct exterior panels.

Another change involved the branding of station wagons, involving both Ford and Mercury. Split away from the Monterey model line, Mercury introduced three new station wagons as a separate model line for 1957, positioning the Mercury brand as a luxury alternative to the Chrysler Town & Country and the Buick Estate. Two-door and four-door station wagons were sold as a base-trim Mercury Commuter and mid-price Mercury Voyager; the top-trim wood-grained Mercury Colony Park was sold with four doors only. To distinguish itself from Ford (and Edsel), all Mercury station wagons were given hardtop rooflines.

Marketed as the flagship of the Mercury station wagon model line, the Colony Park was trimmed and shared a chassis with the similar Mercury Turnpike Cruiser, positioned above the Monterey. The 1957 Colony Park also offered a rear window that retracted into the tailgate, which was not offered on Ford-branded station wagons until 1961. The interior featured several comfort and convenience features, like an electric clock, vinyl upholstery, full passenger compartment carpeting, chrome window surround moldings, rear side vent windows, and simulated mahogany grain vinyl body side trim with simulated maple trim panels as standard features, while a padded dash was optional. The Colony Park was listed with a retail price of US$3,677 ($ in  dollars ) and 7,386 were manufactured.

Sharing its powertrain with the Montclair and the Turnpike Cruiser, the 1957 Colony Park was fitted with a 368 cubic-inch Lincoln Y-Block V8. For 1958, the Y-block was replaced by two "MEL" V8s. The standard engine was a 383 cubic-inch V8, with a 430 cubic-inch V8 available as an option; a "Super Marauder" triple two-barrel carburetor option for the 430 was the first American mass production engine rated at 400 hp.

For 1957, Mercury offered mechanically activated pushbutton transmission controls in response to the Chrysler TorqueFlite pushbutton controls introduced in 1956. The Mercury control buttons initially offered five buttons and was called "Keyboard Control", with a long button on top labeled "Drive" and four smaller buttons below labeled "Brake"; "Neutral Start", which would allow the engine to start with the ignition key; "Hill Control" and "Reverse", with later versions separating the "Drive" button to "Performance" and "Cruising" for 1958 and relabeled as "Multi-Drive". A separate push/pull lever was included below the control buttons labeled "Park", which would lock out the control buttons until the Park button was pulled to release it. The control panel was located to the left of the steering wheel.

All Mercury station wagons were produced with hardtop rooflines, while Ford station wagons did not offer that body style feature. The standard equipment offered on the Colony Park included cloth and vinyl upholstery, fully carpeted floors, electric clock, chrome window surround moldings, full length bodyside stainless steel trim, wheel openings and rocker panel molding, lower rear quarter trim, power steering, power brakes, and 14" wheels. Optional equipment included a heater and defroster; air conditioning; signal-seeking radio; tinted glass; a choice of 4-way power front seat or the "Seat-O-Matic", which offered a rudimentary memory setting for the power front seat; an available third row seat; power windows; dual exhaust; and whitewall tires. The station wagon simulated woodgrain appearance continued, with mahogany with maple trim.

Sales

Second generation (1959-1960)

For the 1959 model year, the Mercury Colony Park was now combined with all station wagons, called the "Country Cruiser" series, with the Commuter, Voyager and Colony Park as gradual trim packages. Originally intended to share a chassis with the premium Edsel Corsair and Edsel Citation as the Edsel wagons were Ford-based, including the woodgrain Edsel Bermuda, the Mercury division was left with its own chassis for 1959 when Edsel was abruptly cancelled due to underwhelming sales and market acceptance. Also, the Colony Park shared its 322 hp Marauder V8 with the Montclair and Monterey. The 1959 Colony Park was listed with a retail price of US$3,932 ($ in  dollars ) and manufactured 5,929, making surviving examples somewhat rare.

For 1960, the 430 V8 made its return. In place of the 400 hp Super Marauder triple-carburetor version, a single 4-barrel carburetor was fitted, reducing output down to 310 hp; this engine was shared with Lincoln, Continental, and the Ford Thunderbird so as to accommodate towing a camping trailer, which saw a rise in popularity. As with the previous generation, both engines were paired with the Merc-O-Matic 3-speed automatic transmission, but the previous keyboard control was discontinued and used a steering column gear selector lever.

Sales

Third generation (1961–1964)

Following the closure of the Edsel division during the 1960 model year, Ford product planners scrambled to build to a better business case for both Lincoln and Mercury divisions. To decrease its production costs, Mercury ended its use of a division-specific chassis and streamlined its product range, with full-size sedans reduced largely to the Monterey. Mercury station wagon nameplates remained the same, with the Commuter differentiated from the Colony Park by its lack of wood-grain trim and higher level of optional equipment as standard. In following with the compact Mercury Comet, all full-size 1961 Mercury lines began production using Ford bodywork and chassis. Now sharing its roofline with the Ford Country Squire, the Colony Park moved from sharing its interior trim from the Montclair to the Monterey.

Though the 1961 redesign of the Mercury product line was not intended as downsizing, the transition between the model years marked a significant decrease in exterior dimensions. From 1960 to 1961, the Mercury Colony Park shed approximately five inches in length, six inches in wheelbase, and approximately 500 pounds of curb weight. The Colony Park remained the luxury level Mercury vehicle, with many optional items included with the listed retail price of US$3,118 ($ in  dollars ) and selling 7,887 examples.

In place of the 430 MEL V8, Mercury fitted the Colony Park with three separate V8 engines. A 292 Y-Block V8 was the standard engine for 1961 and 1962, with 352 and 390 FE V8s as options. In 1963, the 390 became the standard engine. For the first time, 3- and 4-speed manual transmissions were offered in the Colony Park, with the 3-speed Merc-O-Matic as an option.

Sales

Fourth generation (1965–1968)

For 1965, Ford redesigned its entire full-size sedan and station wagon product line, including the Mercury Colony Park, and was once again separated as its own model line with the mid-level Commuter without the simulated mahogany wood trim.  While retaining a body-on-frame chassis, the leaf-spring rear suspension was replaced by a coil-spring live rear axle configuration; through several design changes, the basic layout would be retained through the final Crown Victoria, produced in 2011. While the Colony Park retained its roofline alongside the Ford Country Squire, it adopted the slab-sided design language taken on by Mercury sedans, heavily influenced by the exterior of the Lincoln Continental. The 1965 version was listed at US$3,364 ($ in  dollars ) and 4,213 were manufactured.

Through this generation, Mercury would make several design changes. For 1966, the rear tailgate was updated, marking the debut of the two-way "Magic Doorgate" shared with all other Ford and Mercury station wagons; the design allowed the tailgate to fold down as a tailgate as well as swing out to the driver's side as a door.  For 1967, passenger capacity was expanded, as sideways-facing third-row seats were added as an option. To increase ventilation for the rear of the vehicle, the Colony Park introduced fresh-air ventilation through channels integrated into the D pillar, allowing ventilation if the rear window was retracted, and when the rear window was up, the airflow would be used to keep the rear window clear in inclement weather.

The Colony Park underwent two exterior revisions, in 1967 and 1968, following Lincoln Continental styling updates; redesigns were made to the simulated wood paneling, where the entire side of the body was covered and eliminated the tapered appearance on the front fender. For 1967 and 1968, the Mercury Park Lane coupe and convertible featured the same simulated wood paneling as the Colony Park as an option package. Called "yacht deck paneling" by Mercury, the option was rarely ordered and was discontinued as the Park Lane was replaced by the Mercury Marquis.

For 1965, the 390 V8 was the sole engine. In 1966, Mercury added two additional FE V8s, a 330 hp 410 "Marauder" V8 and a 345 hp 428 "Super Marauder" V8. For 1968, the 410 was dropped, replaced by a 315 hp version of the 390 V8.

Sales

Fifth generation (1969–1978)

Alongside a redesign for the 1969 model year, Ford integrated its station wagon product lines of both Ford and Mercury brands within the nameplates of their sedan counterparts.  For the Colony Park, this change made it part of the Mercury Marquis model line. In contrast to the Marquis sedan, the Colony Park was based on the  wheelbase of the Ford Country Squire and the Ford LTD, and only the Colony Park had concealed headlight covers and the simulated woodgrain body panels, while the Monterey station wagon, which was very similar, did not. This was done to position the Colony Park and Marquis as visually similar to the 1969 Lincoln Continental and the Mark III. The 1969 Colony Park was listed at US$4,457 ($ in  dollars) and 25,604 were made. The Colony Park and Monterey station wagons were the senior level vehicles to the slightly shorter Mercury Montego station wagons, which did also offer the simulated woodgrain appearance.

This generation introduced covered headlights, which were deployed using a vacuum canister system that kept the doors down when a vacuum condition existed in the lines, provided by the engine when it was running. If a loss of vacuum occurred, the doors would retract up so that the headlights were usable if the system should fail. The Magic Doorgate was reworked so that it could swing outward like a conventional door without having to roll the window down, while the glass had to be retracted when opened downwards as a tailgate.

Coinciding with the addition of 5-mph bumpers, Ford and Mercury station wagons underwent a major redesign for 1973, including a completely new roofline. In place of the framed doors, the station wagons were marketed as "pillarless hardtops"; though the roof was fitted with slim B-pillars, the doors were fitted with frameless door glass, a revival of an appearance offered from 1957 to 1960.

Due to its nearly  curb weight, the standard engine was a 400 cubic-inch V8 with a 429 cubic-inch V8 as an option; in 1972, the 429 was replaced by a 460 cubic-inch V8 sourced from Lincoln. For the 1978 model year, a 351 Windsor V8 became standard (outside of California and high-altitude areas), with the 400 and 460 as options. However, most surviving examples are equipped with one of the two larger V8 engines, as they were far more popular, with the 351 proving to have little fuel-economy gains.

Approximately 7,850,000 full-size Fords and Mercurys were sold over 1969–1978. This makes it the second-best selling Ford automobile platform after the Ford Model T.

Sales

Sixth generation (1979–1991)

For 1979, Ford redesigned its full-size sedan and station wagons; the Ford Panther platform brought Ford in line with the downsizing introduced by the 1977 General Motors B-body full-size cars.  To remain competitive (in terms of size and fuel economy) with the Buick Estate and Oldsmobile Custom Cruiser (1978 marked the end of the full-size Chrysler Town & Country station wagon), Ford made extensive changes to its full-size station wagons.  In terms of size, the 1979 Colony Park shed over 11 inches in length, 6.6 inches in wheelbase, 0.4 inches in width, and had lost slightly over 1,000 lbs in weight (in comparison to its 1978 predecessor).  Though technically smaller than the "intermediate" Montego/Cougar station wagon, the Colony Park reduced its cargo-carrying capability only slightly over the 1978 Colony Park.  As before, 8-passenger seating remained standard equipment.

In a revision of the Mercury product range, the Colony Park was moved to the Grand Marquis model line, the flagship of the Mercury brand.  Effectively, it placed the Colony Park above its Country Squire counterpart in terms of trim; as well, this decision cleared room for a Marquis station wagon without woodgrain trim.

In the interest of fuel economy, the Mercury Colony Park underwent an extensive revision of its powertrain lineup.  Although V8 power remained in place, the 400 and 460 V8 engines were removed from all Ford cars, with the Colony Park sharing the 302 Windsor V8 with the Mercury Monarch; the previous base 351 Windsor V8 was offered as an option. For 1981, Ford and Mercury underwent the powertrain revisions of the 1980 Lincoln Continental. The 302 V8 was given fuel injection (now marketed in metric as a "5.0 L"), with both engines paired to the 4-speed AOD overdrive transmission, the first of its type in an American full-size car.  For 1982, the fuel-injected "5.0" V8 became the sole engine offering in all Mercury full-size cars. During 1986, the carbureted 5.8 L V8 returned as an option; examples specified with this engine are rare.

This generation of Colony Park would see few substantial changes during its thirteen-year lifespan. For 1983, it became the sole full-size Mercury wagon, as the previous year's 'base' Marquis wagon was no longer offered as a full-size model. For 1984, the non-woodgrain Grand Marquis (previously Marquis) station wagon was dropped, leaving the Colony Park as the sole version. For 1987, Mercury brought the Colony Park in line with the Sable and Topaz by introducing GS and LS trim levels.

After nine years with only detail changes to the body and trim, the Colony Park received a major update alongside the Grand Marquis for 1988.  From the windshield forward, a more aerodynamic front end better integrated the fenders, grille, headlights, and bumpers. Inside, the front seats were modernized. For 1990, as part of an addition of a driver's side airbag, the entire instrument panel and dashboard received a redesign; all outboard seats received 3-point seatbelts. 1991 was the final shortened model year for the Colony Park, with production ending in December 1990.

References

 Standard Catalog of Ford 1903–1998 by Krause Publications

External links

Grandmarq.net  - forum dedicated to the Ford, Lincoln, and Mercury Panther Chassis

Colony Park
Station wagons
Rear-wheel-drive vehicles
1960s cars
1970s cars
1980s cars
1990s cars
Cars introduced in 1957
Ford Panther platform